The name Barbara has been used for thirteen tropical cyclones worldwide: two in the Atlantic Ocean, seven in the Eastern Pacific Ocean, one in the South Pacific Ocean, one in the Western Pacific Ocean, and two in the South-West Indian Ocean. It has also been used to name one extratropical cyclone in the UK and Ireland.

In the Atlantic:
 Hurricane Barbara (1953), moved up the U.S. east coast.
 Tropical Storm Barbara (1954), made landfall near Vermilion Bay, Louisiana.

in the Eastern Pacific:
 Hurricane Barbara (1983), a category 4 hurricane that stayed far from land.
 Hurricane Barbara (1989), a category 1 hurricane that did not strike land.
 Hurricane Barbara (1995), strong category 4 that remained away from land .
 Tropical Storm Barbara (2001), passed to the northeast of Hawaii.
 Tropical Storm Barbara (2007), made landfall near the Guatemala–Mexico border.
 Hurricane Barbara (2013), large category 1 hurricane that made landfall on the Isthmus of Tehuantepec in Mexico.
 Hurricane Barbara (2019), powerful category 4 hurricane that did not affect land.

In the South Pacific:
 Cyclone Barbara (1967)

In the Western Pacific:
 Typhoon Barbara (1946), made landfall in the Philippines.

In the South-West Indian:
 Tropical Storm Barbara (1960), remained far from land.
 Tropical Storm Barbara (1975), made landfall in Madagascar twice.

In the Europe:
 Storm Barbara (2016), caused minor damage in Northern Ireland and Wales.
 Storm Barbara (2023), storm that affected the eastern Medditeranean after the 2023 Turkey–Syria earthquake.

See also
 Hurricane Neddy, a season eight episode of The Simpsons television series which featured a Hurricane Barbara.

Atlantic hurricane set index articles
Pacific hurricane set index articles
Pacific typhoon set index articles
South-West Indian Ocean cyclone set index articles
Australian region cyclone set index articles